David Berard (born October 17, 1970) is the former head coach for the Holy Cross Crusaders men's ice hockey team.

Career
Berard started his college career as a goaltender for Providence in 1988. He spent four years as a backup for the Friars, playing in only 5 games before graduating with a degree in business marketing. He remained at the college level by taking an assistant coaching position with Colby, staying with the program for two years before returning to his alma mater. Berard was an assistant for the Friars for two more seasons and accepted a similar post from Lake Superior State starting in 1996. Two years later he was back in Providence for a third time but decided to remain with the Friars for an extended period. From 1998 through 2011 he was an assistant coach under Paul Pooley and Tim Army, but he also served as the teams recruiting coordinator for seven seasons, was promoted to an associate coach from 2003 through 2005 and was USA Hockey's director of player development for the New England region from 2003 to 2008.

When Tim Army was replaced by Nate Leaman in 2011, Berard was replaced and he became an assistant with Connecticut. In just over a year, he suddenly found himself as the interim head coach for the Huskies when Bruce Marshall took a medical leave of absence. Berard remained behind the bench for Connecticut for the remainder of the season, compiling a record of 19–10–3 and getting the Huskies into a 3rd place finish in the conference. His efforts were not enough, however, and Connecticut opted to name Mike Cavanaugh as the bench boss for the next season.

Berard found himself back with the Friars yet again the next season as the Director of Hockey Operations but after only one year at that post he left to receive his first full-time head coaching post with Holy Cross. In his short time with the Crusaders Berard has seen a moderate amount of success, recording three consecutive double-digit win seasons but only one of them was above .500.

Personal life
Berard's son Brett is a forward for the Providence Friars men's ice hockey team.  
Brett was drafted by the New York Rangers in the 5th round (134th overall) of the 2020 NHL Entry Draft.  

Berard's youngest son, Brady, is a forward for the US NTDP U-17 team.

Head coaching record

† Berard assumed head coaching duties on November 6, 2012

References

External links

1970 births
Living people
American men's ice hockey goaltenders
Colby Mules men's ice hockey coaches
UConn Huskies men's ice hockey coaches
Holy Cross Crusaders men's ice hockey coaches
Lake Superior State Lakers men's ice hockey coaches
Providence Friars men's ice hockey coaches
Providence Friars men's ice hockey players
People from West Warwick, Rhode Island
Ice hockey coaches from Rhode Island